Sibylla is a female given name. It may refer to:

 Sibylla of Jerusalem (c. 1160–1190), queen regnant of Jerusalem
 Sybilla of Normandy (c. 1092–1122), queen consort of Scotland
 Sibylla of Acerra (1153–1205), queen consort of Sicily
 Sibylla of Lusignan (1198–c. 1230 or 1152), queen consort of Armenia
 Sybilla of Burgundy (1060–1103), duchess of Burgundy
 Sibylla of Anjou (died 1165), countess of Flanders
 Sibylla of Armenia (c. 1240–1290), princess of Antioch
 Sibylla of Anhalt (1514–1614), duchess of Württemberg
 Princess Sibylla of Saxe-Coburg and Gotha (1908–1972), mother of King Carl XVI Gustaf of Sweden
 Sibylla Budd (born c. 1977), Australian actress
 Sibylla Bailey Crane (1851-1902), American educator, composer, author
 Sibylla Schwarz (1621–1638), German poet

Sibylla might be too:
 Sibylla (mantis), a genus of insect
 Sibylla pretiosa, one such species
 168 Sibylla, an asteroid
 Sibylla (fast food), a classic fast food concept marketed in Sweden

See also
 Sibilla (disambiguation)
 Sibyl
 Sibyl (disambiguation)
 Sibylle (disambiguation)
 Queen Sybilla (disambiguation)